Rogosin is a surname. Notable people with the surname include:

Israel Rogosin (1887–1971), American industrialist
Joel Rogosin (1932–2020), American television producer and director
Lionel Rogosin (1924–2000), American filmmaker

See also
Rogozin
Rogozhin
Ragozin